Caffè Concerto is a European style restaurant chain with its headquarters in London, England. It was founded in 1996, and the original branch was on Regent Street. As of 2022, the company runs 19 restaurants/cafes in the United Kingdom, including 18 restaurants in Greater London and one in Grand Central Station in Birmingham. In addition to its British chain, the firm is established in a number of countries in the Middle East, including in Saudi Arabia, Qatar and the UAE. In 2013, Caffè Concerto was voted "fastest growing company" by Real Business Inside.

Products 
Caffè Concerto serves breakfast, lunch, dinner, and afternoon tea. It is known for its opulent window displays of wedding and celebration cakes, as well as live music events at its branches in Westfield and Mayfair.

References

External links
 
 
 https://www.standard.co.uk/business/caff-concerto-owner-notches-up-higher-sales-a4169921.html

Coffeehouses and cafés in the United Kingdom
Restaurants established in 1996
Coffee brands